Hermenegildo Chico dos Santos, also known as Gildo Santos, (born August 16, 1990), is an Angolan professional basketball player. Santos, who stands at 189 cm (6'2"), plays as a point guard.

He currently plays for Angolan side Primeiro de Agosto at the Angolan basketball league BAI Basket and the Africa Champions Cup.

Gildo Santos competed for Angola at the 2013 Afrobasket preliminary Angolan squad. Gildo was elected MVP of the 2016 Angolan league

References

External links
 2009 U-19 FIBA World Cup Stats
 2008 U-18 FIBA Africa Championship Stats
 AfricaBasket Profile
 RealGM Profile

1990 births
Living people
Basketball players from Luanda
Angolan men's basketball players
Point guards
C.D. Primeiro de Agosto men's basketball players
African Games gold medalists for Angola
African Games medalists in basketball
2014 FIBA Basketball World Cup players
Competitors at the 2015 African Games